Santalum murrayanum, commonly known as the bitter quandong, is an Australian plant in the sandalwood family, Santalaceae. The Noongar name for the plant is coolyar.

It bears a bitter fruit, from which a common name derives, in contrast to congener Santalum acuminatum - sweet quandong.
The plant is also known as Ming.
It occurs in a hemi-parasitic relationship with the roots of several other plants, in a non-destructive way, as with all the species of the genus Santalum.

It blooms between October and January producing white to yellow-green flowers. It is found on sandplains and dunes and has a scattered distribution through the Wheatbelt, Great Southern and Goldfields-Esperance regions of Western Australia where it grows in sandy or gravelly lateritic soils.

References

Bushfood
Australian Aboriginal bushcraft
murrayanum
Eudicots of Western Australia
Flora of South Australia
Flora of New South Wales
Flora of Victoria (Australia)